Coom Wedge Tomb is a prehistoric site, a wedge tomb on the Iveragh Peninsula in County Kerry, Ireland. It is near the Skellig Ring, a route in the west of the peninsula.

Description
There are about 400 wedge tombs in Ireland. They are a type of gallery grave, and date from the transition between the Neolithic Age and the Bronze Age.

Legend
In The Pursuit of Diarmuid and Gráinne, a story in Irish mythology, Diarmuid Ua Duibhne and Gráinne were pursued by Fionn mac Cumhaill. They hid in caves to evade capture or, where there were no caves, Diarmuid made shelters. Coom Wedge Tomb, being such a shelter, is known as "Diarmuid and Gráinne's Bed", like other wedge tombs in Ireland.

See also
 List of megalithic monuments in Ireland
 Irish megalithic tombs

References

Archaeological sites in County Kerry
Iveragh Peninsula
Tombs in the Republic of Ireland